Zhiping Weng is the Li Weibo Professor of biomedical research and chair of the program in integrative biology and bioinformatics at the  University of Massachusetts Medical School. She was awarded Fellowship of the International Society for Computational Biology (ISCB) in 2020 for outstanding contributions to computational biology and bioinformatics.

Education
Weng was educated at the University of Science and Technology of China and Boston University where her PhD on the biochemistry of protein-ligand binding was supervised by Charles DeLisi and awarded in 1997.

Career and research
Weng's research interests are in bioinformatics, computational biology, genomics, epigenomics and transcriptional regulation. She is known for her ZDOCK suite of protein-protein docking algorithms, leadership of ENCODE, PsychENCODE, and work on small RNA biology and piwi-interacting RNA (piRNAs).

Awards and honors
Weng is a Fellow of the International Society for Computational Biology (ISCB) and the American Institute for Medical and Biological Engineering (AIMBE).

References

Living people
American bioinformaticians
Fellows of the American Institute for Medical and Biological Engineering
Fellows of the International Society for Computational Biology
Year of birth missing (living people)